Jonathan "Jon" Brunt (born October 5, 1974) is an American curler from Portage, Wisconsin.

At the national level, he is a 2000 United States men's curling champion and a 2000 United States mixed curling champion curler.

Teams

Men's

Mixed

Personal life
He started curling in 1986 at the age of 12.

References

External links

1974 births
Living people
Sportspeople from Madison, Wisconsin
American male curlers
American curling champions
People from Portage, Wisconsin

File